Tikiapara  is a railway station on the Howrah–Kharagpur line. It is located in Tikiapara, Howrah in the Indian state of West Bengal.

History
The Howrah–Kharagpur line was opened in 1900. The Howrah–Kharagpur line was electrified in 1967–69.

The BNR had no station at Haora, and does not to this day. It operated from a siding in Tikiapara, and was later permitted to use the new Haora Station of the EIR.

Car shed
There is a car shed of South Eastern Railway at Tikiapara.

Coaching depot
Tikiapara Coaching Depot maintains 22 primary base trains and 6 round trip trains. Total coach holding capacity is 744 coaches. It handles prestigious trains like Rajdhani Express and Duronto Express. The Coaching Depot is under Howrah Division, Eastern Railway.

References

External links
 Trains at Tikiapara

Railway stations in Howrah district
Kharagpur railway division
Kolkata Suburban Railway stations